Kill Ben Lyk is a British comedy thriller film written by Jean-Christophe Establet, Oliver Maltman and Erwan Marinopoulos, produced by the latter, released 2018 before a French release on VOD in 2020.

In London, in two days times, three people named Ben Lyk were killed. Scotland Yard decides to reunite in an isolated house all of remaining Ben Lyk to ensure their safety.

Plot 

In London, Ben Lyk (portrayed by Eugene Simon), a young YouTuber dreaming of fame worries: in two days time, three people who shared his name were assassinated. He fears he might be the next on the list. After a cry for help, he is taken in by Scotland Yard and driven to an isolated house far away from the city. The police are investigating the serial murders and have decided to reunite all of the Ben Lyk who live in the capital to protect them while they are solving the case. However, this respite is short lived: it seems that the killer managed to infiltrate the place...

Cast

Reception 
 Evan Saathoff wrote, during the 2019 edition of Fantasporto: "Great dose of fun, ends on a punchline for the ages". Alex Saveliev, on his review for the site Film Thread, has a more mixed opinion: "The indie, British answer to Rian Johnson’s Knives Out, Erwan Marinopoulos’ Kill Ben Lyk may lack the sophistication, razor-sharp wit and immaculate plotting of its bigger Hollywood brother, but still provides a diverting, mindless 70 minutes or so of quirky, cheeky fun. Perhaps a better comparison would be Ben Wheatley’s Free Fire, as both films similarly shoot themselves in the foot by stuffing one plot complication too many into the otherwise-minimalist narrative."

Awards 
In 2018, Kill Ben Lyk was nominated for the best thriller category during the Nightmares Film Festival and won the best British feature award during the London Independent Film Awards.

References

External links 
 

2018 films
English films
2010s comedy thriller films
British comedy thriller films
Films set in London
2010s English-language films
2010s British films